Silvius is a genus of flies in the family Tabanidae.

Species
Silvius abdominalis Philip, 1954
Silvius algirus Meigen, 1830
Silvius alpinus (Scopoli, 1763)
Silvius anchoricallus Chen, 1982
Silvius appendiculatus Macquart, 1846
Silvius aquila (Philip, 1968)
Silvius atitlanensis Hays, 1960
Silvius ceras (Townsend, 1897)
Silvius ceylonicus Szilády, 1926
Silvius chongmingensis Zhang & Xu, 1990
Silvius confluens Loew, 1858
Silvius cordicallus Chen & Quo, 1949
Silvius dorsalis Coquillett, 1898
Silvius formosensis Ricardo, 1913
Silvius gibsoni Philip, 1958
Silvius gigantulus (Loew, 1872)
Silvius indianus Ricardo, 1911
Silvius inflaticornis Austen, 1925
Silvius jeanae Pechuman, 1960
Silvius laticornis Meunier, 1902
Silvius latifrons Olsufiev, 1937
Silvius matsumurai Kono & Takahasi, 1939
Silvius megaceras (Bellardi, 1859)
Silvius melanopterus (Hine, 1905)
Silvius merychippi Melander, 1947
Silvius microcephalus Wehr, 1922
Silvius notatus (Bigot, 1892)
Silvius ochraceus Loew, 1858
Silvius olsufjevi Burger, 1989
Silvius omeishanensis Wang, 1992
Silvius ornatus Philip & Mackerras, 1960
Silvius oshimaensis Hayakawa, Takahasi & Suzuki, 1982
Silvius peculiaris Olsufiev, 1971
Silvius philipi Pechuman, 1938
Silvius pollinosus Williston, 1880
Silvius quadrivittatus (Say, 1823)
Silvius sayi Brennan, 1935
Silvius shirakii Philip & Mackerras, 1960
Silvius suifui Philip & Mackerras, 1960
Silvius tanyceras (Osten Sacken, 1886)
Silvius variegatus (Fabricius, 1805)
Silvius zaitzevi Olsufiev, 1941

References

Tabanidae
Taxa named by Johann Wilhelm Meigen
Diptera of Europe
Diptera of Asia
Diptera of North America
Diptera of South America
Brachycera genera